Payal Nair is an Indian actress who is popularly known for her titular role in Meher. She made her film debut in Jungle (2000).

Career 
She is best known for her roles in films like Sorry Bhai! (2008) and for television appearances in series such as Do Saheliyaan... Kismat Ki Kathputaliyaan (2010), Saat Phere: Saloni Ka Safar (2005) and Chand Chupa Badal Mein (2010). In Sorry Bhai (2008), she played the role of "Sandy". The movie got critical acclaim and she too started getting offers.

She's also got to play the double of Meher named Shabana.

She played a prominent role of "Chanchal", aunt of the lead character "Siddharth Sood" (played by Abhishek Tiwari), in the serial called Chand Chupa Badal Mein (2010). She was also seen in the serial called Parrivaar... Kartavya Ki Pariksha.

Filmography

Film
 Jungle (2000)
Kuch Tum Kaho Kuch Hum Kahein (2002)
 Sorry Bhai! (2008)
Once Upon A Time In Mumbaai (2010)
Chhapaak (2020)

Television

Web series

Theatre Play

References

External links 
 
 

Year of birth missing (living people)
Living people
Indian film actresses
Indian television actresses
21st-century Indian actresses